WGUA-LP (98.1 FM), known as Radio Católica, is a low power FM radio station broadcasting a Spanish-language Catholic radio format. Established in 2016, WGUA-LP is licensed to Lawrence, Massachusetts, broadcasting from WCRB's tower in nearby Andover. Its studios are located in Methuen.

Radio Católica is owned by the St. Patrick Parish Lawrence Educational Radio Association.

References

External links
 
 Saint Patrick Parish

GUA-LP
Radio stations established in 2016
2016 establishments in Massachusetts
Lawrence, Massachusetts
Mass media in Essex County, Massachusetts
Catholic radio stations
GUA-LP
GUA-LP